Andrzej Szczypkowski (born November 10, 1971) is a Polish footballer (midfielder) - the captain of Zagłębie Lubin. He is one of the oldest players of Orange Ekstraklasa in the season 2006/2007.

References

1971 births
Living people
Polish footballers
Zagłębie Lubin players
Odra Opole players
People from Oleśnica
Sportspeople from Lower Silesian Voivodeship
Association football midfielders